Streptazolin is an antibiotic and antifungal substance isolated in 1981 from Streptomyces viridochromogenes.

Because of its polymerisation tendency, it is not suitable for therapeutic use. 1,4-reduction of the conjugated diene gives dihydrostreptazolin which is stable, but has very limited antimicrobial properties.

The first total synthesis of (racemic) streptazolin was achieved in 1985 with the aid of a modified Ferrier rearrangement.

References 

Antibiotics
Carbamates
Cyclopentanes
Heterocyclic compounds with 3 rings